Apophthegmata, the plural of apophthegm (also spelled apothegm), a pithy maxim, is the abbreviated title of several collections of aphorisms, adages, maxims, or proverbs, specifically:

 Apophthegmata of Delphi
 Apophthegmata Laconica attributed to Plutarchus
 Apophthegmata Patrum (Sayings of the [Christian Desert] Fathers)
 Apophthegmata Macarii Magni
 Apophthegmatum Opus of Desiderius Erasmus Roterodamus
 Apophthegmata, ex Probatis Graecae Latinaeque Linguae Scriptoribus of Conrad Lycosthenes (circa 1518-61)
 Ars Apophthegmatica (1655-6) of Georg Philipp Harsdörffer
 Der Teutschen Scharpfsinnige kluge Sprüch (1626) of Julius Wilhelm Zincgref

It may also denominate, scire licet, a literary genre.